Wyoming County is a county in the Commonwealth of Pennsylvania. It is part of Northeastern Pennsylvania. As of the 2020 census, the population was 26,069. Its county seat is Tunkhannock. It was created in 1842 from part of Luzerne County.

Wyoming County is included in the Scranton—Wilkes-Barre—Hazleton, PA Metropolitan Statistical Area.

Geography
The county is intersected by the North Branch of the Susquehanna River, and drained by Tunkhannock, Mehoopany, and other large creeks. The land surface is generally hilly or mountainous, Mehoopany, Tunkhannock, Knob, and Bowman's mountains occupying a portion. The soil is fertile. Timber, coal, and iron are very abundant.

Climate
The county has a humid continental climate which is warm-summer (Dfb) except along the river starting below Falls where it is hot-summer (Dfa). Average monthly temperatures in Tunkhannock range from 25.2 °F in January to 70.9 °F in July.

Adjacent counties
Susquehanna County (north)
Lackawanna County (east)
Luzerne County (south)
Sullivan County (west)
Bradford County (northwest)

Major roads

Demographics

As of the census of 2000, there were 28,080 people, 10,762 households, and 7,705 families residing in the county. The population density was 71 people per square mile (27/km2). There were 12,713 housing units at an average density of 32 per square mile (12/km2). The racial makeup of the county was 98.28% White, 0.53% Black or African American, 0.27% Asian, 0.17% Native American, 0.01% Pacific Islander, 0.15% from other races, and 0.59% from two or more races. 0.67% of the population were Hispanic or Latino of any race. 20.3% were of German, 12.9% Irish, 11.9% English, 11.6% Polish, 9.6% American and 8.1% Italian ancestry.

There were 10,762 households, out of which 33.20% had children under the age of 18 living with them, 58.10% were married couples living together, 9.30% had a female householder with no husband present, and 28.40% were non-families. 24.10% of all households were made up of individuals, and 9.90% had someone living alone who was 65 years of age or older. The average household size was 2.55 and the average family size was 3.02. In the county, the population was spread out, with 25.50% under the age of 18, 8.00% from 18 to 24, 28.10% from 25 to 44, 25.20% from 45 to 64, and 13.20% who were 65 years of age or older. The median age was 38 years. For every 100 females there were 98.60 males. For every 100 females age 18 and over, there were 95.80 males.

2020 Census

Politics

|}

As of August 2022, there were 17,031 registered voters in Wyoming County.

 Republican: 10,344 (60.74%)
 Democratic: 4,765 (27.98%)
 No party affiliation: 1,239 (7.27%)
 Other parties: 683 (4.01%)

County commissioners
Richard Wilbur, Chair, Republican
Thomas Henry, Vice-chair, Republican
Ernest King, Democrat

Other county offices
Auditors:
Laura Dickson, Democrat
Ashley Ritz Darby, Republican
Judy Shupp, Republican
District Attorney, Jeff Mitchell, Democrat
Prothonotary, Cindy Adams, Republican
Register of Wills & Recorder of Deeds, Dennis Montross, Republican
Sheriff, Robert Roberts, Republican
Treasurer, Patricia Mead, Republican

State Representative
Karen Boback, Republican, 117th district

State Senator
Lisa Baker, Republican, 20th district

United States House of Representatives
Fred Keller, Republican, Pennsylvania's 12th congressional district

United States Senator
Robert Casey Jr., Democrat
John Fetterman, Democrat

Education

Public school districts
 Elk Lake School District (also in Susquehanna County)
 Lackawanna Trail School District (also in Lackawanna County)
 Lake-Lehman School District (also in Luzerne County)
 Tunkhannock Area School District
 Wyalusing Area School District (also in Bradford County)
 Wyoming Area School District (also in Luzerne County)

Higher education
 Keystone College (also in Lackawanna County)

Transportation
Skyhaven Airport is a public use airport located in Wyoming County, one nautical mile (1.85 km) south of the central business district of Tunkhannock.
 
With the town sited on the lower end of the upper third of the Susquehanna, busily wending its way south to the Chesapeake Bay, the river banks to either side the whole length of the Susquehanna were historically used as a rail transport corridor with competing railroads typically making their way on either side on the important NYC and Philadelphia to Buffalo, New York routes connecting the eastern seaboard to cities such as Chicago on the Great Lakes; towns like Tunkhannock played an important role in the highly competitive stakes for such high profit passenger expresses for steam locomotives had surprisingly short cruising ranges and passenger travel had higher earnings than freight. Today, except for select parts, the river bank rail transport infrastructures remaining are mainly left bank located assets of a single railroad's operations department, even shared roads (operated over by several lines) these days use the single corridor along the east/left river bank connecting the large Sayre Yard on the stateline in Sayre, Pennsylvania further upriver to the transitional Duryea yard. After the collapse of Conrail, trackage on the Northern Susquehanna is operated by Norfolk Southern, with some areas sublet to other road companies. The trackage running through Tunkhannock

Pennsylvania Route 29, a continuation of PA-309 from Philadelphia and Allentown, connects to the New York state line providing north–south road connections by secondary highway while PA-92, and especially U.S. Route 6, provide major east–west secondary highway access to the region.

Communities

Under Pennsylvania law, there are four types of incorporated municipalities: cities, boroughs, townships, and, in at most two cases, towns. The following boroughs and townships are located in Wyoming County:

Boroughs
Factoryville
Laceyville
Meshoppen
Nicholson
Tunkhannock (county seat)

Townships

Braintrim
Clinton
Eaton
Exeter
Falls
Forkston
Lemon
Mehoopany
Meshoppen
Monroe
Nicholson
North Branch
Northmoreland
Noxen
Overfield
Tunkhannock
Washington
Windham

Census-designated places
Lake Winola
Noxen
West Falls

Unincorporated communities
Bellasylva
Forkston
Kasson Brook

Ghost towns
Ricketts

Population ranking
The population ranking of the following table is based on the 2010 census of Wyoming County.

† county seat

See also
National Register of Historic Places listings in Wyoming County, Pennsylvania

References

External links
Wyoming County official site

 
1842 establishments in Pennsylvania
Counties of Appalachia
Populated places established in 1842